Indigofera nummulariifolia is a species of flowering plant from the genus Indigofera.

References

nummulariifolia